Earth Strike is an international grassroots movement that called for a global general strike for climate action. Their aim was a global general strike lasting from 20 until 27 September 2019. The movement has had public support from organizations including Extinction Rebellion and Fridays for Future, as well as public figures including Noam Chomsky. The Earth Strikes were part of the worldwide September 2019 climate strikes, which gathered millions of protesters.

An estimated 6 million people participated in strikes worldwide from 20–27 September. Youth environmental activist Greta Thunberg spoke in New York on the 20 September strike and Montreal on the 27 September strike.

History 
Earth Strike was founded on 10 November 2018 after a user on the subreddit r/Chomsky called for a "General Strike to Save The Planet". The post quickly gathered attention within Reddit, and the r/EarthStrike subreddit was formed to organise a general strike. The initial protests were held on 15 January 2019, with 27 September being announced as the date for the "Earth Strike". General strikes in Iceland in 1975 and India in 2019 were cited as inspirations.

UK actions 

Endorsements 
Trade unions
 The University and College Union (UCU)
 The Bakers, Food and Allied Workers' Union (BFAWU)
 IWW Environmental Unionism Caucus
 International Trade Union Confederation (ITUC)

Politicians
 Alex Sobel MP
 Julie Ward MEP
 Patrick Harvie MSP
 Monica Lennon MSP
 Alison Johnstone MSP
 Neil Findlay MSP
 John Finnie MSP

International organisations
 Extinction Rebellion
 Campaign against Climate Change
 Youth Strike 4 Climate
 350.org
 Action for Sustainable Development (A4SD)
 ActionAid International
 Amnesty International
 Avaaz
 CAN International
 Change.org
 Demand Climate Justice
 Earth Strike
 Fridays for Future
 Friends of the Earth International
 Fund our Future
 Global Forest Coalition
 GreenFaith
 Greenpeace International
 Health of Mother Earth Foundation (HOMEF)
 Indigenous Environment Network (IEN)
 International Student Environmental Coalition
 Oil Change International
 Open.net
 Our Kids' Climate
 Oxfam
 Pan African Climate Justice Alliance
 Parents for Future Global
 War on Want
 World Wide Fund for Nature International (WWF)
 Yes! 4 Humanity

Notable public figures
 Greta Thunberg
 Noam Chomsky
 Naomi Klein
 David Graeber
 Natalie Wynn

Local organizations

Pacific, Australia, New Zealand
 Tipping Point
 School Strike for Climate NZ
 School Strike for Climate Australia
 350 Australia
 350 Aotearoa
 Regenesis
 New England Worker's Party

Asia
 Aksyon Klima
 Alyansa Tigil Mina
 AGHAM Science & Technology for the People
 Agham Youth
 Asian Peoples Movement on Debt and Development
 350 Pilipinas
 350 East Asia
 Lilok Foundation
 Powershift Nepal
 Nepalese Youth For Climate Action
 Waterkeepers Bangladesh
 A SEED JAPAN
 e-shift
 NGO FoE Japan
 NPO Kiko Network
 CAN-Japan
 Global Alliance for Incinerator Alternatives (GAIA)
 Greenpeace Japan
 Green Alliance Japan
 Renewable Energy Institute
 Citizen's Alliance for Saving the Atmosphere and the Earth (CASA)
 Philippine Misereor Partnership Inc.
 PUP SEED Network
 No Burn Pilipinas
 Break Free From Plastics
 Kalikasan Peoples Network for the Environment
 Ecological Justice League of Youth Leaders
 KAISA UP
 University of the Philippines Diliman Student Council
 Youth Strike for Climate PH
 Center for Environmental Concerns
 Philippine Movement for Climate Justice (PMCJ)
 Buklod Tao
 Center for Energy Ecology and Development
 Penuel School of Theology
 Sanlakas
 Power 4 People Coalition
 Global Catholic Climate Movement Philippines (GCCM-PH)
 League of Filipino Students
 Kabataan Partylist
 Safehouse Infoshop
 Japan Association of Environment and Society for the 21st Century
 Citizen for No Coal in Sodegaura (そでがうらしみんがのぞむせいさくけんきゅうかい)
 Citizen's Nuclear Information Center
 Protect Our Winters Japan
 Healthcare Without Harm (HCWH)
 SPARK – Samahan ng Progresibong Kabataan
 Sloth Club
 Peace Boat
 Sapiens Foundation

Eastern Europe, Caucasus and Central Asia
 350 Ukraine
 Ecoaction
 Ekoltava
 UYCA
 Sweet Osvit
 Fridays For Future Ukraine
 O.ZERO
 One Planet
 U-Cycle

Europe
 Klimastreik Schweiz
 WeMove.eu
 Earth Strike NL
 FridaysforFuture NL
 Teachers for Climate NL
 Code Rood
 Fossielvrij NL
 Stamp Out Poverty
 Europe Beyond Coal
 ActionAid France
 Adéquations
 Alternatiba / ANV-COP 21
 Amis de la Terre France
 Association l’Âge de faire
 ATD Quart Monde
 Attac France
 BUND
 BUND Jugend
 Campact
 Collectif des Associations Citoyennes
 Cap ou pas cap
 Carre Geo&Environnement
 CCFD-Terre Solidaire
 Chrétiens Unis pour la Terre
 Citoyens Pour le Climat
 CliMates
 Colibris
 Collectif Gilets Jaunes Argenteuil
 Comité pour le Respect des Libertés et des Droits de l’Homme en Tunisie (CRLDHT)
 Confédération paysanne
 Coordination EAU Île-de-France
 CRID
 CSP75/CISPM
 E-Graine
 Enseignant.e.s. pour la planète
 Étudiants et Développement
 Fédération des Tunisiens pour une Citoyenneté des deux Rives (FTCR)
 Fondation Danielle Mitterrand
 Fondation ELYX
 Fondation Nicolas Hulot
 Greenpeace France
 Greenpeace Germany
 Immigration Développement Démocratie
 Ingénieurs sans frontières
 Klima-Allianz
 La Mine
 Le Début des Haricots
 Ligue des droits de l’Homme
 Mouvement de la Paix
 Mouvement Utopia
 MRAP (Mouvement contre le racisme et pour l’Amitié entre les Peuples)
 NABU
 NAJU Jugend
 Naturfreunde
 Naturfreunde Jugend
 Notre Affaire À Tous
 ODASS
 Oxfam France
 RADSI Nouvelle-Aquitaine
 REFEDD
 Réseau Foi et Justice Afrique Europe
 ResiWay
 Sciences Citoyennes
 Sherpa
 SOL
 Alternatives Agroécologiques et Solidaires
 Together for Future
 Umwelt Institut
 Un Climat de Changement
 Union des Tunisiens pour l’Action Citoyenne (Utac)
 Union syndicale Solidaires
 Unis Pour Le Climat
 Urbamonde
 WWF Jugend
 Workers For Future France
 Youth For Climate France
 ZEA

Africa
 Fridays For Future Uganda
 350 Africa
 AfrikaVuka

Latin America
 350.org America Latina

North America
 Sunrise Movement
 Peoples Climate Movement
 Oil Change International
 Indigenous Environmental Network
 Center for Biological Diversity
 Greenpeace USA
 Amazon Watch
 350.org
 350 Canada
 Friends of the Earth U.S.
 Food and Water Watch
 Elected Officials to Protect America
 People's Action
 STAND.earth
 350 PDX
 350Kishwaukee (Illinois)
 Sierra Club
 Earth Strike Canada
 MN350
 Climate Justice Alliance
 The Climate Mobilization
 Progressive Democrats of America
 Parents For Future Seattle
 The Climate Reality Project
 March for Science
 NextGen America
 Our Children's Trust
 Climate Reality Youth Working Group
 Seventh Generation
 Lush Fresh Handmade Cosmetics
 198 methods
 Rock the Earth (LCV Education Fund)
 Rootskeeper
 Center for Popular Democracy
 Labor Network for Sustainability
 Hip Hop Caucus
 GreenFaith
 La Planète s’invite au Parlement
 Women's March
 Climate Guides / Youth4Nature
 Berkshire Environmental Action Team (BEAT)
 Moms Clean Air Force
 Ben & Jerry's Homemade, Inc.
 Our Children's Trust
 No Kill Magazine
 350 Charlotte (NC, USA)
 David Gibson for US Senate
 Mobilized.news
 The New School
 Blue Future
 Peoples Climate Movement NY

Days of action 
 19 July 2019 - Youth Strike for Climate
 August 2019 - Climate protest
 20 September 2019 - General Strike for Climate

See also 

 Earth Day
 Earth Hour
 Ecotax
 Environmentalism
 Extinction Rebellion
 Green ban
 Green economy
 Green growth
 Green politics
 Green recovery
 Just Transition
 School strike for climate

References

External links 
 

2019 protests
2019 in the environment
Climate change and society
Environmental protests
Direct action
General strikes
International climate change organizations